Night was a rock band formed in 1978 in Los Angeles, California, United States, whose personnel were veteran British-based session musicians.

History
Night's vocalists Stevie Vann (aka Stevie Lange) and Chris Thompson had met when Vann had provided backing vocals for the 1978 album Watch by Manfred Mann's Earth Band then fronted by Thompson. Soon afterwards Thompson invited Vann to join him in a new outfit, Vann's session group known as Bones having recently disbanded and Thompson having reduced his involvement with Manfred Mann's Earth Band. Before officially forming as "Night" in LA, the new group toured the London pub-rock scene in 1978 under the name "Filthy McNasty" performing the mix of originals and covers that became their first album. They are recorded on "A Week at the Bridge" (The Bridge House, Canning Town) and had their UK release event at The Golden Lion, Fulham.

Richard Perry produced two albums by Night for his Planet label; the group's eponymous 1979 debut album yielded two US Top 40 hits: "Hot Summer Nights" (No. 18) and "If You Remember Me" (No. 17).

"Hot Summer Nights", a cover of a minor Walter Egan hit, featured Lange on lead vocals and gave Night their one international hit most significantly in Australia at No. 3 with more moderate success in Canada (No. 23), the Netherlands (No. 21), New Zealand (No. 28) and South Africa (No. 13).

"If You Remember Me", recorded as the theme song for the film The Champ, was introduced on the Night album but in its single release credited solely to Chris Thompson with another album track "Cold Wind Across My Heart" - featuring both Thompson and Vann - being marketed as the second Night single; the latter track failed to chart and the Night album peaked at a moderate No. 113, the group's gig opening for the Doobie Brothers failing to significantly boost their popularity.

A second album release by Night in 1980 entitled Long Distance produced a minor hit in its single release: "Love on the Airwaves", and was otherwise overlooked. Night had no further recordings released but did not officially disband until 1982.

Night can be seen in the 1980 film The Monster Club performing "The Stripper".

Discography

Albums

Singles

Re-Issues
 Night (Self titled limited edition vinyl re-issue) (2020)
 Hot Summer Nights/ Love On The Airwaves (Singles) (Limited Edition vinyl) (2020)

Line-up
 Chris Thompson (vocals, guitar)
 Stevie Lange (vocals)
 Robbie McIntosh (guitar, vocals)
 Billy Kristian (bass)
 Nicky Hopkins (keyboards) 1978-1979
 Bobby Wright (keyboards) 1979-1982
 Pete Baron (drums) 1978-1979
 Bobby Guidotti (drums) 1979-1982

References

External links 
 Official Website for Stevie Vann Lange
 Night page at Discogs

Musical groups from Los Angeles
Progressive rock musical groups from California